Jake Atlee James Metz (born March 16, 1991) is an American football defensive end who is currently a free agent. He played college football at Shippensburg. He played for the Soul from 2015 to 2016, winning ArenaBowl XXIX in 2016. He is currently the defensive lines coach for the Souderton Area High School’s football team in Pennsylvania.

Early years
Metz attended Souderton Area High School, in Souderton, Pennsylvania, where he was a member of the football and basketball teams. He was number 10.

College career
Metz attended Shippensburg University, where he was a member of the football team. He wore number 99.

College career statistics

Professional career
Metz was rated the 39th best defensive end in the 2014 NFL Draft by NFLDraftScout.com.

In 2014, Metz had workouts with the Philadelphia Eagles, the New York Giants, and the Detroit Lions after going undrafted in the 2014 NFL Draft.

Philadelphia Soul
Metz was assigned to the Philadelphia Soul of the AFL on October 7, 2014. He played in his first game on May 30, 2015, against the Las Vegas Outlaws, recording a tackle. On August 17, 2016, Metz was named the AFL's Defensive Lineman of the Year. The Soul won ArenaBowl XXIX against the Arizona Rattlers on August 26, 2016.

Philadelphia Eagles
Metz signed with the NFL's Philadelphia Eagles on August 30, 2016. On September 3, 2016, he was released by the Eagles.

Qingdao Clipper
Metz was selected by the Qingdao Clipper of the China Arena Football League (CAFL) in the third round of the 2016 CAFL Draft. He earned All-Pro North Division All-Star honors in 2016. He was listed on the Clipper's roster for the 2018 season.

Buffalo Bills
On April 7, 2017, Metz signed with the Buffalo Bills. On August 29, 2017, he was released by the Bills.

Philadelphia Eagles (second stint)
On August 30, 2017, Metz was claimed off waivers by the Eagles, only to be waived two days later. On March 12, 2019, Metz was again assigned to the Soul.

AFL statistics

Stats from ArenaFan:

References

External links
 Philadelphia Soul bio 

1991 births
Living people
American football defensive ends
Shippensburg Red Raiders football players
Philadelphia Soul players
Philadelphia Eagles players
Players of American football from Philadelphia
Qingdao Clipper players
Buffalo Bills players
People from Souderton, Pennsylvania